U.S. Route 75 (US 75) is a major north-south highway that enters the U.S. state of Oklahoma from Texas concurrent with US 69 crossing the Red River. US 75 serves the city of Tulsa, the 2nd largest city in Oklahoma.

Route description
US 75 enters the state concurrent with US 69 as a freeway. The freeway status drops between Colbert and Calera. The two highways regain their freeway status in Durant. This freeway ends about 12 miles north of Durant. The two highways split in Atoka. Through traffic traveling to Tulsa usually uses US 69 to the Indian Nation Turnpike as a faster route.

Leaving Atoka, US 75 serves many small communities and crosses the Canadian River before reaching I-40/US 62 about 82 miles northwest of Atoka. The three highways travel east to Henryetta. US 62 and US 75 leave I-40 at an interchange with the Indian Nation Turnpike. The two highways serve as a major route through the town. US 62 leaves US 75 in Okmulgee.

Coming out of Okmulgee, US 75 starts to enter a more urban area traveling into Tulsa. US 75 becomes a freeway in Glenpool, interchanging with the Creek Turnpike in Jenks. US 75 travels through western Tulsa before reaching an interchange at I-244. The two highways travel into Downtown Tulsa together, where US 75 splits off with a short overlap with US 64/SH 51. US 75 leaves downtown crossing I-244 for a second time.

US 75 serves north Tulsa before returning to a surface highway. From here, the highway travels to Kansas, only passing through the major community of Bartlesville.

Tulsa expressways
The following is list of names for the expressway part of US 75 in the Tulsa area.
Okmulgee-Bee Line Expressway (Okmulgee to Creek Turnpike)
Okmulgee Expressway (Creek Turnpike to I-244)
Martin Luther King, Junior Memorial Expressway (overlap with I-244)
Broken Arrow Expressway (southern leg of Inner Dispersal Loop)
Paul Harvey Memorial Expressway (eastern leg of the Inner Dispersal Loop)
Chapelle Family Memorial Expressway (Inner Dispersal Loop to East 56th Street North)
Cherokee Expressway (56th Street and north).

Junction list

References

External links

75
 Oklahoma
Transportation in Bryan County, Oklahoma
Transportation in Atoka County, Oklahoma
Transportation in Coal County, Oklahoma
Transportation in Hughes County, Oklahoma
Transportation in Okfuskee County, Oklahoma
Transportation in Okmulgee County, Oklahoma
Transportation in Tulsa County, Oklahoma
Transportation in Tulsa, Oklahoma
Transportation in Washington County, Oklahoma